Kuitasuk is a village in the Nicobar district of Andaman and Nicobar Islands, India. It is located in the Nancowry tehsil, on the Chowra island.

Demographics 

According to the 2011 census of India, Kuitasuk has 77 households. The effective literacy rate (i.e. the literacy rate of population excluding children aged 6 and below) is 42.06%.

References 

Villages in Nancowry tehsil